Natural Rebel is the fifth studio album by English singer and musician, Richard Ashcroft. The album was released on 19 October 2018 through Righteous Phonographic Association and BMG Rights Management. This is the first Ashcroft album not produced by longtime producer Chris Potter, instead by Jon Kelly and Emre Ramazanoglu, who was also contributed drums on this album.

Release and promotion
The album was announced on 15 August 2018 through his social media, along with Ashcroft's UK tour. The first single from the album, "Surprised by the Joy", was released on 10 September 2018. The second single, "Born to Be Strangers", was released on 22 October 2018. The third single, "That's When I Feel It", was released on 23 January 2019.

Track listing

 Deluxe Edition bonus tracks

 Digital released track

Charts

References

2018 albums
Richard Ashcroft albums
Albums produced by Jon Kelly
BMG Rights Management albums